UFC 144: Edgar vs. Henderson was a mixed martial arts pay-per-view event held by the Ultimate Fighting Championship on February 26, 2012 at the Saitama Super Arena in Saitama, Japan.

Venue
UFC 144 was held at the Saitama Super Arena in the Chūō-ku central ward of Saitama City in Saitama Prefecture. The sellout event was held in the Super Arena's Main Stage Center Arena configuration, with a ticket cost of between ¥5,800 and ¥100,000 (ca. US$70 – US$1250).

Background
UFC 144 marked the UFC's fifth appearance in Japan, their first event in Japan since UFC 29 in 2000, and its first event in Japan since the 2007 purchase of Pride Fighting Championships, which held many of its cards at Saitama Super Arena. The UFC event featured seven fights on the main card.

George Sotiropoulos was expected to face Takanori Gomi at this event, but was forced out of the bout with an injury and replaced by Eiji Mitsuoka.

Leonard Garcia was expected to face Zhang Tiequan at this event, but was forced out of the bout with an injury. Issei Tamura stepped in for Garcia and fought Zhang.

At the UFC 144 weigh ins, Quinton Jackson failed to make the 206 lb weight limit and came in 5 lbs overweight at 211 lbs. Jackson was fined 20 percent of his earnings and the bout was contested at a catchweight of 211 lb.

Results

Bonus awards
Fighters were awarded $65,000 bonuses.
 Fight of the Night: Frankie Edgar vs. Benson Henderson
 Knockout of the Night: Anthony Pettis
 Submission of the Night: Vaughan Lee

See also
List of UFC events
2012 in UFC

References

Ultimate Fighting Championship events
2012 in mixed martial arts
Mixed martial arts in Japan
Sport in Saitama (city)
2012 in Japanese sport